Favonius orientalis is an East Palearctic species of hairstreak butterfly found in China, Amur, Ussuri, Kunashir, Japan, and Korea.

The larva feeds on Quercus mongolica, Quercus serrata, Quercus dentata, Quercus acutissima, Quercus variabilis and Fabaceae.

Subspecies 
F. o. orientalis (Honshu)
F. o. shirozui Murayama, 1956 (Hokkaido)
F. o. schischkini Kurentzov, 1970 (Amur, Ussuri, Kunashir)

References

Theclini
Butterflies described in 1875
Taxa named by Richard Paget Murray
Butterflies of Asia